David Martínez Varela (born 31 January 1967 in Betanzos, A Coruña) is a retired discus thrower from Spain, who represented his native country at three consecutive Summer Olympics, starting in 1992. He is a ten-time national champion in the men's discus event.

International competitions

References
  Spanish Olympic Committee

1967 births
Living people
Spanish male discus throwers
Athletes (track and field) at the 1992 Summer Olympics
Athletes (track and field) at the 1996 Summer Olympics
Athletes (track and field) at the 2000 Summer Olympics
Olympic athletes of Spain
Sportspeople from A Coruña
World Athletics Championships athletes for Spain
Mediterranean Games silver medalists for Spain
Mediterranean Games medalists in athletics
Athletes (track and field) at the 2001 Mediterranean Games